Annelie Johansson (born 21 December 1978) is a Swedish long-distance runner. She competed in the marathon event at the 2015 World Championships in Athletics in Beijing, China.

References

External links

1978 births
Living people
Swedish female long-distance runners
Swedish female marathon runners
World Athletics Championships athletes for Sweden
Place of birth missing (living people)
20th-century Swedish women